Shoeburyness High School is a coeducational secondary academy school in Southend-on-Sea, Essex. The school is larger than the average sized secondary academy, with almost 1800 students on roll. 275 of the enrolled students are in the sixth form.

History 
Shoeburyness High School gained Technology College status in September 1999. As part of the plan, a CAD/CAM Centre was developed.

The school gained Leading Space Education School status in September 2008, and has since implemented a number of space-themed projects in Science, including the Year 8 Space Academy course and outreach work with local primary schools.

The school became an academy in December 2011.

The school is part of a local academy trust, SECAT, based at SECAT House, Caulfield Road, Shoeburyness.

Academics 
In Key Stage 3 pupils are taught Art, Design and Technology, Drama, English, French, Geography, History, ICT, Maths, Music, Physical Education, Religious Education, Science and SCOPE (PSHE). In Key Stage 4 pupils then study English, Maths and Science as their three core GCSE subjects and others which can be chosen as their options (GCSEs and BTECs are available).

The school has a Sixth Form with a curriculum including both A-Level and vocational courses. The Sixth Form offers a range of subjects including Business Studies, Film Studies, Performing Arts, Media Studies, History, Geography, English, Maths, Physics, Chemistry, Biology, IT, Music Technology among others.

Demographics 
In its 2013 report, Ofsted noted that the "majority of students are of White British heritage. A small proportion are from minority ethnic backgrounds." Additionally, they noted that "proportion of students supported by the pupil premium is above average. This additional funding is for students who are known to be eligible for free school meals, in local authority care, or from a family with a parent in the armed forces. The proportion of disabled students and those who have special educational needs supported at school action is below average, but the proportion supported at school action plus or through a statement of special educational needs is above average."

Ofsted  
Shoeburyness High School was regarded as "Good with outstanding features" by Ofsted in 2013. As of 2022, its most recent inspection was in 2017, when it was again judged Good.

Rats  
In late 2019, rats were found at the school. This sent shockwaves through the community, and Shoeburyness High School was featured in multiple news outlets up and down the country as a result. The rats were spotted in the toilets, and it is believed they were using the school as a feasting ground, picking up any crumbs dropped by children during the day. There were also odd smells present around the school, as the school made an attempt to clear the air vents of the rats.

References

External links
Shoeburyness High School Website

Academies in Southend-on-Sea
Secondary schools in Southend-on-Sea
Bilateral schools in England